"X-Men: Divided We Stand" is a 2008 comic book story line published by Marvel Comics as a follow-up story line to the "Messiah Complex" story arc.

Publication
The story started with the issues of the X-Men-related titles cover dated April 2008. This included: The Uncanny X-Men; Wolverine vol. 3; X-Factor vol. 3; and X-Men vol. 2, which was retitled X-Men: Legacy. It also launched three ongoing titles - Cable vol. 2, X-Force vol. 3, and Young X-Men - and a self-titled, two-issue limited series. Each ongoing series ran a separate story arc with "Divided We Stand" providing an overall theme. The aftermath of the story is continued in "X-Men: Manifest Destiny".

Individual titles
Uncanny X-Men
X-Factor (comics)
Young X-Men
X-Men: Legacy
X-Force
Cable (comics)
Wolverine
Free Comic Book Day

Plot
The X-Men are disbanded. A new X-Force team is formed to carry out covert assassination missions. Striking out on his own as usual, Wolverine hunts down Mystique to make her pay for her actions in Messiah Complex, while Cable tries to protect the mutant baby from Lucas Bishop.

Reading order

Uncanny X-Men
Uncanny X-Men #495
Uncanny X-Men #496
Uncanny X-Men #497
Uncanny X-Men #498
Uncanny X-Men #499

X-Men: Legacy
X-Men: Legacy #208
X-Men: Legacy #209
X-Men: Legacy #210
X-Men: Legacy #211
X-Men: Legacy #212
X-Men: Legacy #213
X-Men: Legacy #214

X-Factor
X-Factor Vol. 3 #28
X-Factor Vol. 3 #29
X-Factor Vol. 3 #30
X-Factor Vol. 3 #31
X-Factor Vol. 3 #32

X-Force
X-Force Vol. 3 #1 (2008)
X-Force Vol. 3 #2
X-Force Vol. 3 #3
X-Force Vol. 3 #4
X-Force Vol. 3 #5
X-Force Vol. 3 #6

Wolverine
Wolverine Vol. 3 #62
Wolverine Vol. 3 #63
Wolverine Vol. 3 #64
Wolverine Vol. 3 #65

Cable
Cable Vol. 2 #1 (2008)
Cable Vol. 2 #2
Cable Vol. 2 #3
Cable Vol. 2 #4
Cable Vol. 2 #5
King-Size Cable Spectacular #1 (2008)

Central title
X-Men: Divided We Stand #1 (2008)
X-Men: Divided We Stand #2

Young X-Men
Young X-Men #1 (2008)
Young X-Men #2
Young X-Men #3
Young X-Men #4
Young X-Men #5

References

External links

Comics by Matt Fraction